The men's sabre was one of eight fencing events on the fencing at the 1960 Summer Olympics programme. It was the fourteenth appearance of the event. The competition was held from 7 to 8 September 1960. 70 fencers from 29 nations competed. Nations had been limited to three fencers each since 1928. The event was won by Rudolf Kárpáti, the eighth of nine straight Games in which a Hungarian would win the event. Kárpáti was the second man to successfully defend an Olympic title in the men's sabre (Jenő Fuchs in 1908 and 1912) and fifth to win multiple medals of any color. His teammate Zoltán Horváth took silver while Wladimiro Calarese of Italy finished with the bronze.

Background

This was the 14th appearance of the event, which is the only fencing event to have been held at every Summer Olympics. Five of the eight finalists from 1956 returned: gold medalist Rudolf Kárpáti of Hungary, silver medalist Jerzy Pawłowski of Poland (who, in 1968, would finally break the Hungarian run of nine straight gold medals in the event), fourth-place finisher Jacques Lefèvre of France, fifth-place finisher (and three-time medalist, with bronze in 1936, gold in 1948, and silver in 1952) Aladár Gerevich of Hungary, and sixth-place finisher Wojciech Zabłocki of Poland. The three world champions since the last Olympics were Pawłowski (1957), Yakov Rylsky of the Soviet Union (1958), and Kárpáti (1959).

Israel, Morocco, New Zealand, Tunisia, and Vietnam each made their debut in the men's sabre. Italy made its 12th appearance in the event, most of any nation, having missed the inaugural 1896 event and the 1904 St. Louis Games.

Competition format 

The competition used a pool play format, with each fencer facing the other fencers in the pool in a round robin. Bouts were to 5 touches. Barrages were used to break ties necessary for advancement. However, only as much fencing was done as was necessary to determine advancement, so some bouts never occurred if the fencers advancing from the pool could be determined. The competition involved 5 rounds:
 Round 1: 12 pools, 6 fencers to a pool (two pools had 5 due to withdrawals), top 3 advance (total 36 advancing)
 Round 2: 6 pools, 6 fencers to a pool, top 4 advance (total 24 advancing)
 Quarterfinals: 4 pools, 6 fencers to a pool, top 3 advance (total 12 advancing)
 Semifinals: 2 pools, 6 fencers to a pool, top 4 advance (total 8 advancing)
 Final: 1 pool, 8 fencers

Schedule

All times are Central European Time (UTC+1)

Results

Round 1

The top three fencers in each pool advanced.

Round 1 Pool A

Round 1 Pool B

Round 1 Pool C
Menendez of Cuba was entered in this pool, but did not start.

Round 1 Pool D

 Barrage

Round 1 Pool E

Round 1 Pool F

Round 1 Pool G

 Barrage

Round 1 Pool H

 Barrage

Round 1 Pool I

Round 1 Pool J
Schwende of Canada was entered in this pool but did not start.

 Barrage

Round 1 Pool K

Round 1 Pool L

 Barrage

Round 2

Round 2 Pool A

Round 2 Pool B

Round 2 Pool C

Round 2 Pool D

Round 2 Pool E

Round 2 Pool F

 Barrage

Quarterfinals

Quarterfinal A

Quarterfinal B

Quarterfinal C

Quarterfinal D

Semifinals

Semifinal A 

 Barrage

Semifinal B 

 Barrage

Final 

A four-way tie for second place required a barrage to determine the silver and bronze medals (as well as 4th and 5th place). The tie for 7th and 8th place was broken based on touches received.

 Barrage

Overall standings

References

Sabre men
Men's events at the 1960 Summer Olympics